USS R-19 (SS-96) was an R-class coastal and harbor defense submarine of the United States Navy.

Construction and commissioning
R-19s keel was laid down by the Union Iron Works of San Francisco on 23 June 1917. She was launched on 28 January 1918 sponsored by Mrs. Robert L. Irvine, and commissioned on 7 October 1918.

United States Navy service
After commissioning, which was one month before the Armistice with Germany ending World War I took effect, R-19 remained on the West Coast of the United States for nine months at  San Pedro Submarine Base , San Pedro, Los Angeles until March 1919, and then at San Francisco, undergoing overhaul, until June 1919. On 17 June 1919 R-19 left the United States for the Territory of Hawaii. Eight days later she reached Pearl Harbor in Hawaii and began almost 12 years of training submarine crews and testing equipment.

During July 1920 the hull classification symbol of R-19 was changed from "Submarine Number 96" to "SS-96."

On 12 December 1930, R-19 left Pearl Harbor for the Philadelphia Navy Yard. En route she called at San Diego; voyaged south to the Panama Canal Zone; negotiated the Panama Canal; then voyaged north through the Caribbean Sea and the coastal waters of the US East Coast; and, finally, up Delaware Bay and the Delaware River to Philadelphia.

On 15 May 1931, R-19 was decommissioned at the Philadelphia Navy Yard and placed in the reserve fleet at that shipyard, where she remained berthed at League Island for the next nine years.

R-19 was recommissioned on 6 January 1941, then went to the Naval Submarine Base New London at Groton, Connecticut, where she was reconditioned. During May 1941, R-19 headed south. For the remainder of the spring, summer, and into the fall of 1941, she patrolled and conducted training exercises in the Virgin Islands and off the Panama Canal Zone. In October 1941, R-19 returned to Groton and continued her role as a training submarine.

On 9 March 1942, R-19 was decommissioned again.

For her service in the United States Navy, the R-19 was eligible for the World War I Victory Medal, American Defense Service Medal, American Campaign Medal and the World War II Victory Medal.

Royal Navy service as HMS P.514

R-19 was transferred to the United Kingdom under the terms of Lend-Lease on 9 March 1942. Commissioned into the Royal Navy, she was renamed HMS P.514.

In June 1942 she sailed for St. Johns, Newfoundland, under the command of Lieutenant Walter Phillimore, RN. At 0300 on 21 June 1942, while on surface, P.514 encountered a Royal Canadian Navy minesweeper, off Newfoundland. Unaware of any friendly submarines in the area and receiving no reply to her challenge, Georgian rammed P.514, which sank with the loss of all hands.

A Board of Inquiry ruled that Georgians commanding officer had acted correctly.

Lt. Phillimore's parents lived at Swinbrook, Oxfordshire, England. There is a memorial to P.514s officers and men in the Church of England parish church of St. Mary the Virgin in Swinbrook.

References

External links
 

 

United States R-class submarines
World War I submarines of the United States
World War II submarines of the United States
Ships built in San Francisco
1918 ships
Ships transferred from the United States Navy to the Royal Navy
United States R-class submarines of the Royal Navy
World War II submarines of the United Kingdom
Friendly fire incidents of World War II
Submarines sunk in collisions
World War II shipwrecks in the Atlantic Ocean
Maritime incidents in June 1942
Warships lost with all hands
Lost submarines of the United Kingdom
Submarines sunk by Canadian warships